Hvězdárna Hradec Králové (Hradec Králové Observatory) is part astronomical observatory and part planetarium. Also housed in the same building are the Institute of Atmospheric Physics and the Czech Hydrometeorological Institute.  It is located on the southern outskirts of Hradec Králové in the Czech Republic, and was founded in 1961.

See also
 List of astronomical observatories

References

External links
 Observatory and Planetarium Hradec Králové

Astronomical observatories in the Czech Republic
Planetaria in the Czech Republic
Buildings and structures in Hradec Králové
1961 establishments in Czechoslovakia
20th-century architecture in the Czech Republic